The 1963 Kent State Golden Flashes football team was an American football team that represented Kent State University in the Mid-American Conference (MAC) during the 1963 NCAA University Division football season. In their 18th season under head coach Trevor J. Rees, the Golden Flashes compiled a 3–5–1 record (1–5 against MAC opponents), finished in sixth place in the MAC and were outscored by all opponents by a combined total of 122 to 107.

The team's statistical leaders included Bill Asbury with 349 rushing yards, Ron Mollric with 293 passing yards, and Tom Zuppke with 122 receiving yards.

On October 23, 1963, Trevor Rees announced his resignation as Kent State's head football coach, effective at the end of the 1963 season. He compiled a 92–63–5 in 18 years as Kent State's coach, but at the time of his announcement, his teams had gone 5–17–1 since the start of the 1961 season. After Rees announced his resignation, the team won three of four games to conclude the 1963 season.

Schedule

References

Kent State
Kent State Golden Flashes football seasons
Kent State Golden Flashes football